Elizabeth Andrews may refer to:

Elizabeth Andrews (1882–1960), first woman organiser of the Labour Party in Wales
Elizabeth B. Andrews (1911–2002), U.S. Representative from Alabama
Elizabeth Kay Andrews, Baroness Andrews (born 1943), British politician
Elizabeth Andrew (rugby union), Australian rugby player

See also
Liz Andrew (1948–1993), Australian politician